Ian Justin Boyton (born 19 August 1974) is a former English cricketer. Boyton was a right-handed batsman who bowled right-arm medium pace. He was born in Barking, London.

Boyton represented the Middlesex Cricket Board in a single List A match against Scotland in the 1st round of the 2002 Cheltenham & Gloucester Trophy which was held in 2001. In his only List A match he scored 31 runs and with the ball he took a single wicket at a cost of 21 runs.

References

External links
Ian Boyton at Cricinfo
Ian Boyton at CricketArchive

1974 births
Living people
People from Barking, London
Cricketers from Greater London
English cricketers
Middlesex Cricket Board cricketers